Venus Williams was the two-time defending champion, but withdrew before the tournament started due to injury.

Caroline Wozniacki defeated Svetlana Kuznetsova 6–1, 6–3 in the final. Although she had lost the World No. 1 ranking to Kim Clijsters the previous week, she reclaimed the spot by defeating Shahar Pe'er in the quarterfinals.

Seeds
The top eight seeds received a bye into the second round.

Note: Anastasia Pavlyuchenkova, who would have been the 10th seed, entered late and played the qualifying tournament. She was not seeded in the main draw. She was eliminated in the first round.

Qualifying

Draw

Finals

Top half

Section 1

Section 2

Bottom half

Section 3

Section 4

External links
 WTA tournament draws

2011 Dubai Tennis Championships
Dubai Tennis Championships - Women's Singles